Carabost is a foresting community in the south-east part of the Riverina.  It is situated about 16 kilometres north west of Rosewood and 22 kilometres south east of Kyeamba.

Carabost can be found on the Tumbarumba Road near the location of the Carabost National Forest - a large Pine Plantation in the area.  The only facilities available in the area, other than the Carabost Town Hall built in 1927, and a Fire Brigade Shed, is a public telephone box and a post box - both at the same location as the district emergency gathering point which is used in the case of forest fire or similar emergency.

Carabost is the Gaelic form of Carbost on the Scottish island of Skye and means Copse farm.

Carabost Post Office opened on 1 March 1879, and it closed on 4 March 1897. It then reopened on 1 January 1915 and was closed once again on 27 January 1968

Gold was known to exist in the area, from at least the late 1880s, but Carabost was not as well known for gold, as the neighbouring mining areas of Humula and Tumbarumba. During the 1920s, parts of the locality of Carabost were mined for gold by dredging.

Climate 

Being the first of the higher ground on the South West Slopes in a westerly wind, Carabost experiences cool maximum temperatures relative to its altitude (particularly in winter), averaging just  in July.

Notes and references

External links

Towns in the Riverina
Ghost towns in New South Wales